Calor may refer to:

Science
 Heat, in thermodynamics, or the human perception of:
 Thermal energy, in physics and engineering
 Temperature, the manifestation of thermal energy
 Heat, one of the cardinal signs of inflammation in medicine

Other uses
 Calor River (disambiguation)
 Calore Irpino (or Calore Beneventano), a tributary of the Volturno
 Calore Lucano (or Calore Salernitano), a tributary of the Sele
 Calor Gas, a brand of bottled propane and butane gas
 Calor (album), a 1992 album by Julio Iglesias

See also

 Calorie, a unit of energy
 Caloric theory, an obsolete scientific theory
 Caloric reflex test, a test of the vestibulo-ocular reflex
 Caloric, a brand of kitchen appliances
 Calorimetry, thermodynamic state measurement
Caloy
 Heat (disambiguation)